Ráckeve is a district in southern part of Pest County. Ráckeve is also the name of the town where the district seat is found. The district is located in the Central Hungary Statistical Region.

Geography 
Ráckeve District borders with Szigetszentmiklós District to the north, Dabas District to the east, Kunszentmiklós District (Bács-Kiskun County) to the south, Dunaújváros District and Martonvásár District (Fejér County) to the west. The number of the inhabited places in Ráckeve District is 11.

Municipalities 
The district has 1 town, 2 large villages and 8 villages.
(ordered by population, as of 1 January 2013)

The bolded municipality is city, italics municipalities are large villages.

Demographics

In 2011, it had a population of 35,732 and the population density was 86/km².

Ethnicity
Besides the Hungarian majority, the main minorities are the German (approx. 1,250), Roma (800), Serb (300) and Romanian (100).

Total population (2011 census): 35,732
Ethnic groups (2011 census): Identified themselves: 33,858 persons:
Hungarians: 30,997 (91.55%)
Germans: 1,236 (3.65%)
Gypsies: 775 (2.29%)
Others and indefinable: 850 (2.51%)
Approx. 2,000 persons in Ráckeve District did not declare their ethnic group at the 2011 census.

Religion
Religious adherence in the county according to 2011 census:

Catholic – 13,063 (Roman Catholic – 12,868; Greek Catholic – 195);
Reformed – 8,123;
Orthodox – 254;
Evangelical – 150;
other religions – 473; 
Non-religious – 4,199; 
Atheism – 318;
Undeclared – 9,152.

Gallery

See also
List of cities and towns in Hungary

References

External links
 Postal codes of the Ráckeve District

Districts in Pest County